Dewdney was a provincial electoral district in the Canadian province of British Columbia.  Its predecessor was the riding of Westminster-Dewdney, which was created for the 1894 election from a partition of the Westminster riding, which was a rural-area successor to the original New Westminster riding, which was one of the province's first twelve.

Demographics

Political geography 

This riding was composed of the municipalities of Pitt Meadows, Maple Ridge and Mission, plus all the rural areas to the east of Mission as far as the Harrison River.

Notable MLAs 

Richard McBride, 16th Premier of British Columbia
John Oliver, 19th Premier of British Columbia
Dave Barrett, 26th Premier of British Columbia
George Mussallem
Lyle Wicks
Peter Rolston

Electoral history 
Note: Winners in each election are in bold.

|-

|Liberal
|William Waugh Forrester
|align="right"|219 	
|align="right"|33.90%
|align="right"|
|align="right"|unknown
|- bgcolor="white"
!align="right" colspan=3|Total valid votes
!align="right"|646
!align="right"|100.00%
!align="right"|
|- bgcolor="white"
!align="right" colspan=3|Total rejected ballots
!align="right"|
!align="right"|
!align="right"|
|- bgcolor="white"
!align="right" colspan=3|Turnout
!align="right"|%
!align="right"|
!align="right"|
|- bgcolor="white"
!align="right" colspan=7|1 16th Premier of British Columbia.
|}

|-
 
|Liberal
|Robert Jardine
|align="right"|241
|align="right"|38.56%
|align="right"|
|align="right"|unknown

|- bgcolor="white"
!align="right" colspan=3|Total valid votes
!align="right"|625
!align="right"|100.00%
!align="right"|
|- bgcolor="white"
!align="right" colspan=3|Total rejected ballots
!align="right"|
!align="right"|
!align="right"|
|- bgcolor="white"
!align="right" colspan=3|Turnout
!align="right"|%
!align="right"|
!align="right"|
|- bgcolor="white"
!align="right" colspan=7|2  Simultaneously MLA for Victoria City
|}

|-

 
|Liberal
|Alister Thompson
|align="right"|302
|align="right"|32.58%
|align="right"|
|align="right"|unknown
|- bgcolor="white"
!align="right" colspan=3|Total valid votes
!align="right"|927
!align="right"|100.00%
!align="right"|
|- bgcolor="white"
!align="right" colspan=3|Total rejected ballots
!align="right"|
!align="right"|
!align="right"|
|- bgcolor="white"
!align="right" colspan=3|Turnout
!align="right"|%
!align="right"|
!align="right"|
|}

|- bgcolor="white"
!align="right" colspan=3|Total valid votes
!align="right"|997
!align="right"|100.00%

|-

 
|Liberal
|John Oliver 3
|align="right"|927
|align="right"|54.08%
|align="right"|
|align="right"|unknown
|- bgcolor="white"
!align="right" colspan=3|Total valid votes
!align="right"|1,714 	
!align="right"|100.00%
!align="right"|
|- bgcolor="white"
!align="right" colspan=3|Total rejected ballots
!align="right"|
!align="right"|
!align="right"|
|- bgcolor="white"
!align="right" colspan=3|Turnout
!align="right"|%
!align="right"|
!align="right"|
|- bgcolor="white"
!align="right" colspan=7|3  19th Premier of British Columbia as of 1918.
|}

|-

 
|Federated Labour Party
|William Jamieson Curry
|align="right"|473
|align="right"|14.01%
|align="right"|
|align="right"|unknown
 
|Liberal
|Donald Bruce Martyn
|align="right"|1,369
|align="right"|40.54%
|align="right"|
|align="right"|unknown
|- bgcolor="white"
!align="right" colspan=3|Total valid votes
!align="right"|3,377 
!align="right"|100.00%
!align="right"|
|- bgcolor="white"
!align="right" colspan=3|Total rejected ballots
!align="right"|
!align="right"|
!align="right"|
|- bgcolor="white"
!align="right" colspan=3|Turnout
!align="right"|%
!align="right"|
!align="right"|
|}

|-
{{CANelec|BC|Conservative|John Alexander Catherwood 4|1,259|36.60%||unknown}}

 
|Liberal|William Maxwell Smith
|align="right"|1,246 	
|align="right"|36.22%
|align="right"|
|align="right"|unknown
|- bgcolor="white"
!align="right" colspan=3|Total valid votes
!align="right"|3,440
!align="right"|100.00%
!align="right"|
|- bgcolor="white"
!align="right" colspan=3|Total rejected ballots
!align="right"|
!align="right"|
!align="right"|
|- bgcolor="white"
!align="right" colspan=3|Turnout
!align="right"|%
!align="right"|
!align="right"|
|- bgcolor="white"
!align="right" colspan=7|4  A judicial recount on 29 July 1924 gave Maxwell Smith four extra votes, reducing Catherwood's majority to nine (34 British Columbia Reports 246). A further recount appears to have taken place as a Supreme Court decision of 9 February 1925 which voided the election refers to Catherwood's majority as five. Catherwood was unseated but reinstated 8 June 1925. 
|}

|-

 
|Liberal
|David Whiteside
|align="right"|1,946 	
|align="right"|41.43%
|align="right"|
|align="right"|unknown
|- bgcolor="white"
!align="right" colspan=3|Total valid votes
!align="right"|4,697 	
!align="right"|100.00%
!align="right"|
|- bgcolor="white"
!align="right" colspan=3|Total rejected ballots
!align="right"|159
!align="right"|
!align="right"|
|- bgcolor="white"
!align="right" colspan=3|Turnout
!align="right"|%
!align="right"|
!align="right"|
|}

|-

|Independent
|Charles George Evans
|align="right"|85
|align="right"|2.09%
|align="right"|
|align="right"|unknown

 
|Co-operative Commonwealth Fed.
|George Albert Miller
|align="right"|967 	
|align="right"|23.75%
|align="right"|
|align="right"|unknown

|Independent
|Solomon Mussallem
|align="right"|588 	
|align="right"|14.44%
|align="right"|
|align="right"|unknown
 
|Liberal|David William Strachan|align="right"|1,235|align="right"|30.34%|align="right"|
|align="right"|unknown
|- bgcolor="white"
!align="right" colspan=3|Total valid votes
!align="right"|4,071 	
!align="right"|100.00%
!align="right"|
|- bgcolor="white"
!align="right" colspan=3|Total rejected ballots
!align="right"|43
!align="right"|
!align="right"|
|- bgcolor="white"
!align="right" colspan=3|Turnout
!align="right"|%
!align="right"|
!align="right"|
|}

|-
 
|Co-operative Commonwealth Fed.
|James Miller Cameron
|align="right"|1,274
|align="right"|26.75%
|align="right"|
|align="right"|unknown

 
|Liberal
|David William Strachan
|align="right"|1,618 	
|align="right"|33.98%
|align="right"|
|align="right"|unknown
|- bgcolor="white"
!align="right" colspan=3|Total valid votes
!align="right"|4,762
!align="right"|100.00%
!align="right"|
|- bgcolor="white"
!align="right" colspan=3|Total rejected ballots
!align="right"|84
!align="right"|
!align="right"|
|- bgcolor="white"
!align="right" colspan=3|Turnout
!align="right"|%
!align="right"|
!align="right"|
|}

|-

 
|Co-operative Commonwealth Fed.
|Thomas Greer MacKenzie
|align="right"|2,539 	
|align="right"|31.48%
|align="right"|
|align="right"|unknown
 
|Liberal
|David William Strachan
|align="right"|2,532 	
|align="right"|31.39%
|align="right"|
|align="right"|unknown
|- bgcolor="white"
!align="right" colspan=3|Total valid votes
!align="right"|8,066
!align="right"|100.00%
!align="right"|
|- bgcolor="white"
!align="right" colspan=3|Total rejected ballots
!align="right"|117
!align="right"|
!align="right"|
|- bgcolor="white"
!align="right" colspan=3|Turnout
!align="right"|%
!align="right"|
!align="right"|
|}

|-
 
|Co-operative Commonwealth Fed.
|William Leonard Hartley
|align="right"|3,953 	
|align="right"|46.29%
|align="right"|
|align="right"|unknown

|- bgcolor="white"
!align="right" colspan=3|Total valid votes
!align="right"|8,539
!align="right"|100.00%
!align="right"|
|- bgcolor="white"
!align="right" colspan=3|Total rejected ballots
!align="right"|96
!align="right"|
!align="right"|
|- bgcolor="white"
!align="right" colspan=3|Turnout
!align="right"|%
!align="right"|
!align="right"|
|}

|-

 
|Co-operative Commonwealth Fed.
|William Leonard Hartley
|align="right"|7,604 	
|align="right"|45.92%
|align="right"|
|align="right"|unknown

|- bgcolor="white"
!align="right" colspan=3|Total valid votes
!align="right"|16,560 	
!align="right"|100.00%
!align="right"|
|- bgcolor="white"
!align="right" colspan=3|Total rejected ballots
!align="right"|343
!align="right"|
!align="right"|
|- bgcolor="white"
!align="right" colspan=3|Turnout
!align="right"|%
!align="right"|
!align="right"|
|}

|-

|Co-operative Commonwealth Fed.
|Harry Dean Ainlay
|align="right"|6,024             
|align="right"|30.91%
|align="right"|7,248  
|align="right"|42.48%
|align="right"|
|align="right"|unknown

|Liberal
|Reginald Clarence Cox
|align="right"|3,631                       
|align="right"|18.63%
|align="right"| –
|align="right"| – %
|align="right"|
|align="right"|unknown

|Progressive Conservative
|Roderick Charles MacDonald 
|align="right"|2,233    
|align="right"|11.46% 
|align="right"|-
|align="right"|-% 
|align="right"|
|align="right"|unknown

|- bgcolor="white"
!align="right" colspan=3|Total valid votes
!align="right"|19,488            
!align="right"|100.00%
!align="right"|17,061   
!align="right"|%
!align="right"|
|- bgcolor="white"
!align="right" colspan=3|Total rejected ballots
!align="right"|800 
!align="right"|
!align="right"|
|- bgcolor="white"
!align="right" colspan=3|Turnout
!align="right"|%
!align="right"|
!align="right"|
|- bgcolor="white"
!align="right" colspan=9|5(Preferential ballot: 1st and 3rd counts of three shown only) 	
|}

|-

|Liberal
|Arthur Albyn Emery
|align="right"|3,715 	                       
|align="right"|19.65%
|align="right"| –
|align="right"| – %
|align="right"|
|align="right"|unknown

|Co-operative Commonwealth Fed.
|Kenneth William Pattern
|align="right"|7,003 	 	 	     
|align="right"|37.04%
|align="right"|8,310  
|align="right"|47.82%
|align="right"|
|align="right"|unknown

|Progressive Conservative
|Murray Lorne Watkins
|align="right"|559 	   
|align="right"|2.96% 
|align="right"|-
|align="right"|-% 
|align="right"|
|align="right"|unknown

|- bgcolor="white"
!align="right" colspan=3|Total valid votes
!align="right"|18,906 	  		           
!align="right"|100.00%
!align="right"|17,376    
!align="right"|%
!align="right"|
|- bgcolor="white"
!align="right" colspan=3|Total rejected ballots
!align="right"|953
!align="right"|
!align="right"|
|- bgcolor="white"
!align="right" colspan=3|Turnout
!align="right"|%
!align="right"|
!align="right"|
|- bgcolor="white"
!align="right" colspan=9|6(Preferential ballot: 1st and 5th counts of five shown only) 	
|}

|-
 
|Liberal
|Michale Joseph Butler
|align="right"|4,141 	
|align="right"|19.15%
|align="right"|
|align="right"|unknown
 
|Co-operative Commonwealth Fed.
|Naranjan Singh Grewall
|align="right"|7,211 	
|align="right"|33.35%
|align="right"|
|align="right"|unknown

|- bgcolor="white"
!align="right" colspan=3|Total valid votes
!align="right"|21,619 	
!align="right"|100.00%
!align="right"|
|- bgcolor="white"
!align="right" colspan=3|Total rejected ballots
!align="right"|293
!align="right"|
!align="right"|
|- bgcolor="white"
!align="right" colspan=3|Turnout
!align="right"|%
!align="right"|
!align="right"|
|}

|-
 
|Co-operative Commonwealth Fed.|Dave Barrett 7|align="right"|12,637|align="right"|43.73%'''
|align="right"|
|align="right"|unknown
 
|Progressive Conservative
|James Ross Gulloch
|align="right"|803
|align="right"|2.78%
|align="right"|
|align="right"|unknown

 
|Liberal
|Walter Raymond Thompson
|align="right"|4,512 	
|align="right"|15.61%
|align="right"|
|align="right"|unknown

|- bgcolor="white"
!align="right" colspan=3|Total valid votes
!align="right"|28,898	
!align="right"|100.00%
!align="right"|
|- bgcolor="white"
!align="right" colspan=3|Total rejected ballots
!align="right"|406
!align="right"|
!align="right"|
|- bgcolor="white"
!align="right" colspan=3|Turnout
!align="right"|%
!align="right"|
!align="right"|
|- bgcolor="white"
!align="right" colspan=7|7 26th Premier of British Columbia 1972–1975.
|}

|-

 
|Liberal
|Wilfred Robert Jack
|align="right"|4,051 		
|align="right"|14.62%
|align="right"|
|align="right"|unknown

 
|Progressive Conservative
|Lyn Morrow
|align="right"|1,532 	
|align="right"|5.53%
|align="right"|
|align="right"|unknown
|- bgcolor="white"
!align="right" colspan=3|Total valid votes
!align="right"|27,714 
!align="right"|100.00%
!align="right"|
|- bgcolor="white"
!align="right" colspan=3|Total rejected ballots
!align="right"|251
!align="right"|
!align="right"|
|- bgcolor="white"
!align="right" colspan=3|Turnout
!align="right"|%
!align="right"|
!align="right"|
|}

|-
 
|Liberal
|Thomas H. Davison
|align="right"|1,146 	
|align="right"|9.41%
|align="right"|
|align="right"|unknown

|- bgcolor="white"
!align="right" colspan=3|Total valid votes
!align="right"|12,181
!align="right"|100.00%
!align="right"|
|- bgcolor="white"
!align="right" colspan=3|Total rejected ballots
!align="right"|88
!align="right"|
!align="right"|
|- bgcolor="white"
!align="right" colspan=3|Turnout
!align="right"|%
!align="right"|
!align="right"|
|}

|-

 
|Liberal
|Peter Macaulay McDonald
|align="right"|1,987 	
|align="right"|12.26%
|align="right"|
|align="right"|unknown

|- bgcolor="white"
!align="right" colspan=3|Total valid votes
!align="right"|16,210 
!align="right"|100.00%
!align="right"|
|- bgcolor="white"
!align="right" colspan=3|Total rejected ballots
!align="right"|158
!align="right"|
!align="right"|
|- bgcolor="white"
!align="right" colspan=3|Turnout
!align="right"|%
!align="right"|
!align="right"|
|}

|-

 
|Progressive Conservative
|Edward Arthur Watson
|align="right"|1,717 	
|align="right"|8.71%
|align="right"|
|align="right"|unknown
 
|Liberal
|Theodore John Worthington
|align="right"|1,214 	
|align="right"|6.16%
|align="right"|
|align="right"|unknown
|- bgcolor="white"
!align="right" colspan=3|Total valid votes
!align="right"|19,707
!align="right"|100.00%
!align="right"|
|- bgcolor="white"
!align="right" colspan=3|Total rejected ballots
!align="right"|164
!align="right"|
!align="right"|
|- bgcolor="white"
!align="right" colspan=3|Turnout
!align="right"|%
!align="right"|
!align="right"|
|}

|-
 
|Progressive Conservative
|John Willison Green
|align="right"|1,249 	
|align="right"|5.19%
|align="right"|
|align="right"|unknown

|Independents
|Douglas Wilbur Maddin
|align="right"|188 	
|align="right"|0.78%
|align="right"|
|align="right"|unknown

|- bgcolor="white"
!align="right" colspan=3|Total valid votes
!align="right"|24,074
!align="right"|100.00%
!align="right"|
|- bgcolor="white"
!align="right" colspan=3|Total rejected ballots
!align="right"|247
!align="right"|
!align="right"|
|- bgcolor="white"
!align="right" colspan=3|Turnout
!align="right"|%
!align="right"|
!align="right"|
|}

|-

|- bgcolor="white"
!align="right" colspan=3|Total valid votes
!align="right"|24,641
!align="right"|100.00%
!align="right"|
|- bgcolor="white"
!align="right" colspan=3|Total rejected ballots
!align="right"|467
!align="right"|
!align="right"|
|- bgcolor="white"
!align="right" colspan=3|Turnout
!align="right"|%
!align="right"|
!align="right"|
|}

|-

 
|Liberal
|Robert L. Moore
|align="right"|410 	
|align="right"|1.28%
|align="right"|
|align="right"|unknown

|- bgcolor="white"
!align="right" colspan=3|Total valid votes
!align="right"|32,065
!align="right"|100.00%
!align="right"|
|- bgcolor="white"
!align="right" colspan=3|Total rejected ballots
!align="right"|366
!align="right"|
!align="right"|
|- bgcolor="white"
!align="right" colspan=3|Turnout
!align="right"|%
!align="right"|
!align="right"|
|}

|-
 
|Liberal
|Bruce Bingham
|align="right"|2,203 	
|align="right"|3.48%
|align="right"|
|align="right"|unknown

|- bgcolor="white"
!align="right" colspan=3|Total valid votes
!align="right"|63,347 	
!align="right"|100.00%
!align="right"|
|- bgcolor="white"
!align="right" colspan=3|Total rejected ballots
!align="right"|766
!align="right"|
!align="right"|
|- bgcolor="white"
!align="right" colspan=3|Turnout
!align="right"|%
!align="right"|
!align="right"|
|- bgcolor="white"
!align="right" colspan=7|7  Seat increased to two members from one.
|}

Sources 

Elections BC historical returns

Former provincial electoral districts of British Columbia
Pitt Meadows
Maple Ridge, British Columbia
Mission, British Columbia